Mariah Storch (born 21 June 1997) is an Australian rugby league footballer who plays for the Central Queensland Capras in the QRL Women's Premiership. 

Primarily a er, she is a Queensland representative and previously played for the Brisbane Broncos in the NRL Women's Premiership, where she won two premierships.

Background
Born in Barcaldine, Queensland, Storch began playing rugby league for the Blackwater Crushers in 2015.

Playing career

2018
In June, Storch represented Queensland Country at the Women's National Championships. On 22 June, she made her debut for Queensland, coming off the bench in their 10–16 State of Origin loss to New South Wales.

On July, Storch joined the Brisbane Broncos NRL Women's Premiership team. In Round 1 of the 2018 NRL Women's season, she made her debut for the Broncos, coming off the bench in a 30–4 win over the St George Illawarra Dragons.

On 30 September, Storch came off the bench in the Broncos' Grand Final win over the Sydney Roosters.

2019
In May, Storch represented Queensland Country at the Women's National Championships. On 6 October, Storch won her second NRLW premiership, coming off the bench in the Broncos' 30–6 Grand Final win over the Dragons.

2020
In 2020, Storch joined the Central Queensland Capras for the inaugural season of the QRL Women's Premiership. She later missed the 2020 NRL Women's season due to pregnancy.

References

External links
QRL profile

1997 births
Living people
Australian female rugby league players
Rugby league second-rows
Brisbane Broncos (NRLW) players